Key Club can refer to:

 Key Club, service program for high school students
 Key Club (jazz club), jazz venue in Newark, New Jersey
 Key Club (Sunset Strip), former music venue on Sunset Strip in West Hollywood, Los Angeles, California (later reopened as 1 Oak)
 Key Club Recording Company, recording facility in Benton Harbor, Michigan